was a  after Bunka and before Tenpō. This period spanned the years from April 1818 through December 1830.

Change of era
 April 22, 1818:  The new era name was created to mark the enthronement of the emperor Emperor Ninko in Bunka 15.

The new era name was drawn from an aphorism attributed to the ancient Chinese emperor, Great Shun (大舜): "Shun reads the Heavens, and so brings together all seven governments" (舜察天文、斉七政).

Events of the Bunsei era
 1822 (Bunsei 5): Edo was struck with 150 earthquake tremors over three days.
 August 11, 1823 (Bunsei 6, 6th day of the 7th month):  German flora- and fauna-taxonomist Philipp Franz von Siebold arrives at Dejima as new physician for the Dutch trading post in Nagasaki harbor.  Bakufu policy in this era was designed to marginalize the influence of foreigners in Bunsei Japan; however, an unintended and opposite consequence of sakoku was to enhance the value and significance of a very small number of thoughtful observers like von Siebold, whose writings document what he learned or discovered first-hand.  Von Siebold's published accounts and unpublished writings provided a unique and useful perspective for Orientalists and Japanologists in the 19th century; and his work continues to be rigorously examined by modern researchers today.
 August 13, 1830 (Bunsei 13, 25th day of the 6th month): Earthquake at Kyoto (Latitude: 35.000/Longitude: 136.000), no Richter Scale magnitude suggested by available data.

Notes

References
 Hammer, Joshua. (2006). Yokohama Burning: The Deadly 1923 Earthquake and Fire that Helped Forge the Path to World War II.  New York: Simon & Schuster. ;  OCLC 67774380
 Nussbaum, Louis Frédéric and Käthe Roth. (2005). Japan Encyclopedia. Cambridge: Harvard University Press. ; OCLC 48943301
 Screech, Timon. (2006). Secret Memoirs of the Shoguns: Isaac Titsingh and Japan, 1779–1822. London: RoutledgeCurzon. ; OCLC 65177072

See also
 An'ei – Carl Peter Thunberg, Isaac Titsingh
 Genroku – Engelbert Kaempfer

External links 
 National Diet Library, "The Japanese Calendar" – historical overview plus illustrative images from library's collection

Japanese eras
1810s in Japan
1820s in Japan
1830s in Japan